The 16th Armored Division was an armored division of the United States Army in World War II. In its one and only combat operation, the 16th Armored Division liberated the city of Pilsen in western Czechoslovakia (modern Bohemia in the Czech Republic), an operation that influenced the landscape of post-war Europe.

History
The division was activated on 15 July 1943 at Camp Chaffee in Arkansas. They performed all of their training at Camp Chaffee until they received their staging orders. They staged at Camp Shanks at Orangeburg, New York on 28 January 1945, until got their port call. They sailed from the New York Port of Embarkation on 5 February 1945.

The 16th Armored Division arrived in France in stages between 11 and 17 February 1945, and processed into the European Theater of Operations. They had been assigned to the Fifteenth United States Army on 29 January 1945, but were waiting for an assignment to a unit actually involved in fighting.

The division was assigned to Third United States Army on 17 April 1945, and entered Germany on 19 April 1945.  It crossed the Rhine at Mainz, and relieved the 71st Infantry Division at Nürnberg on 28 April 1945. The 23rd Cavalry Reconnaissance Squadron participated in combat from the Isar River to Wasserburg with the 86th Infantry Division. While under the control of that organization, it crossed the Isar River at Granek on 30 April 1945, advanced to Indorf, seized several small villages, and was driving toward Wasserburg against slight resistance when ordered to return to Nürnberg. The division was given a security and training mission at Nürnberg, Germany, until 5 May. When the 23rd Cavalry Squadron arrived at Nürnberg on 4 May, it reverted to the control of the 16th Armored. The division assembled and proceeded to Waidhaus, Germany on 5 May.

Combat chronicle
During the final days of battle in Europe, the final stronghold of German armed forces was a pocket in Czechoslovakia.  As Soviet Red Army and American forces moved to the area, there was debate between US and British leaders regarding attempts to deny the Soviets a post-war foothold in Czechoslovakia. It was decided that the American forces would help the Soviets subdue the estimated 141,000 German troops before exiting the area. The task was aided by the desire of German forces to avoid imprisonment by the Soviets, with numerous German divisions arranging surrender to US forces, if the Americans arrived first. This did not stop fanatical German SS Troops from continuing to fight both Czechoslovakian and, as they arrived, American forces.

The 16th Armored Division was assigned to V Corps on 6 May, and attacked through the lines of the 97th Infantry Division, with Combat Command B (CCB) making the main effort. They advanced along the Bor–Pilsen Road that same day, launching an attack on Pilsen, Czechoslovakia, designed to capture the Skoda Munitions Plant. Combat Command Reserve (CCR) advanced through Pilsen to assigned high ground east of the city. The division spent 7 and 8 May in mopping up activities and patrolling. General Patton ordered elements of the 16th AD to move towards Prague, where the German commander was waiting to surrender to US forces, but the troops were recalled to Pilsen per the agreement with the Soviet Union. Aside from the few hours on the road to Prague, the capture of Pilsen marked the deepest point of American penetration into Czechoslovakia, .

The Division suffered the lightest casualty count of all US Armored Divisions in Europe, with only 12 wounded, and spent 3 days in combat.

Three months later, the 16th AD was still located in Czechoslovakia, in Stříbro (west of Pilsen), on VJ Day.

The division returned to the New York Port of Embarkation on 13 October 1945 and was inactivated at Camp Kilmer in New Jersey on 15 October 1945.

Casualties
Total battle casualties: 32
Killed in action: 4
Wounded in action: 28

Composition 
The division was composed of the following units:

 Headquarters Company
 Combat Command A
 Combat Command B
 Reserve Command
 5th Tank Battalion
 16th Tank Battalion
 26th Tank Battalion
 18th Armored Infantry Battalion
 64th Armored Infantry Battalion
 69th Armored Infantry Battalion
 23rd Cavalry Reconnaissance Squadron (Mechanized)
 216th Armored Engineer Battalion
 156th Armored Signal Company
 16th Armored Division Artillery
 393rd Armored Field Artillery Battalion
 396th Armored Field Artillery Battalion
 397th Armored Field Artillery Battalion
 16th Armored Division Trains
 137th Armored Ordnance Maintenance Battalion
 216th Armored Medical Battalion
 Military Police Platoon
 Band

Attachments to the 16th AD
 633rd Tank Destroyer Battalion (Self-propelled) 1 May 1945 – 14 June 1945
 571st Antiaircraft Artillery Battalion 20 April 1945 – 19 May 1945
I 1st Platoon, 994th Engineer Treadway Bridge Company 6 May 1945 – 10 May 1945
 B Battery, 987th Field Artillery Battalion (155mm Gun) 6 May 1945 – 15 May 1945

Assignments in the European Theater of Operations
 29 January 1945: Fifteenth Army, Twelfth Army Group
 17 April 1945: Third Army, Twelfth Army Group
 6 May 1945: V Corps, Third Army

Honors

Campaigns
Central Europe

Individual Awards
Distinguished Service Cross 2
Silver Star 4
Soldiers Medal 1
Bronze Star 135
Air Medal 1

Commanders
MG Douglass T. Greene – 15 July 1943 – September 1944
BG John L. Pierce – September 1944 – 15 October 1945

Division artillery commander
COL. Barksdale Hamlett

16th Armored Division Association
16th Armored Division Association
2517 Connecticut Avenue
Washington, D. C.
16th Armored Division Association Facebook Page

Newspaper
The 16th Armadillo, first published in Pilsen, Czechoslovakia in June 1945

See also
Prague Offensive
633rd Tank Destroyer Battalion
United States Third Army
Twelfth United States Army Group

References

Bibliography
Stanton, Shelby L. (1984) ORDER OF BATTLE: US Army in World War II; Presidio Press:Novato, CA. 
McGaw, E. J., The Army Almanac: A Book of Facts Concerning the Army of the United States, U.S. Government Printing Office, 1950, pp. 510–592
U.S. Army Center of Military History - 16th Armored Division - World War II Divisional Combat Chronicles  access date = 3 October 2015
Dickerson, Bryan J. There at the End: The U.S. 16th Armored Division’s Liberation of Plzen. access date = 3 October 2015

16th Armored Division, U.S.
Armored Division, U.S. 16th
Military units and formations established in 1943
Military units and formations disestablished in 1945